Langfang may refer to:

 Langfang, a prefecture-level city in Hebei Province, China
 Aleksandr Langfang, a Soviet lieutenant-general

See also
 Lanfang (disambiguation)